Tommaso Amantini (9 March 1625 – 1675) was an Italian sculptor and painter of the Baroque period. He was born in Urbania in the Marche region, and died in Rome. He studied with Bartoccini in Urbania, where he worked on maiolica. He then went to Borgo San Sepolcro to work with Federico Gioia In Rome he was part of the circle working for Bernini. He created some of the sculptures for the oratory of Saint Catherine in Urbania.

References

1625 births
1675 deaths
People from the Province of Pesaro and Urbino
17th-century Italian painters
Italian male painters
17th-century Italian sculptors
Italian male sculptors